Nicholas Saunders (died 1605) was an English politician.

He was the only son of Thomas Saunders of Uxbridge, Middlesex and educated at King's College, Cambridge (1565).

He was employed as a government messenger carrying state correspondence to overseas countries. At one stage (1585) he got into debt and spent time in prison.

He was elected a Member (MP) of the Parliament of England for Penryn in 1589, St. Ives in 1593, Helston in 1597 and Lostwithiel in 1601.

He never married.

References

16th-century births
1605 deaths
Members of the pre-1707 English Parliament for constituencies in Cornwall
English MPs 1589
English MPs 1593
English MPs 1597–1598
English MPs 1601
Alumni of King's College, Cambridge